Kim Stevenson is an American business executive best known for her leadership in managing technology businesses and driving IT digital transformation for some of the largest technology brands in the world over the past three decades including NetApp, Lenovo, Intel, IBM, EDS, and HPE. She currently serves on the board of directors for Mitek Systems and Skyworks Solutions, as well as on the advisory board of TruU, a privately held software company.

Early life and education 
Stevenson earned a bachelor's degree from Northeastern University and holds a master's degree in Business Administration from Cornell University.

In her free time, Stevenson is an avid tennis player and enjoys kayaking and paddle boarding.

She does volunteer work for the National Park Service National Canoe and Safety Patrol volunteer org at the Delaware River National recreation area.

Career 
In August 2021 Stevenson left NetApp to focus on full time board service. Most recently Kim served as Senior Vice President & General Manager of NetApp's Foundational Data Services Business Unit, NetApp's largest business unit.

Prior to NetApp, she was a Senior Vice President and General Manager for Data Center Infrastructure at Lenovo. Before joining Lenovo, Stevenson spent five years at Intel, as chief operating officer (COO) for the Client, Internet of Things and System Architecture (CISA) Group. Prior to that, she was Intel's chief information officer (CIO).

Before Intel, she held a variety of positions at EDS, including vice president of its worldwide communications, media and entertainment (CM&E) industry practice, as well as vice president of enterprise service management, where she oversaw the global development and delivery of enterprise services.

Before EDS, Stevenson spent 18 years at IBM in several executive positions including Vice President of Marketing and Operations of the eServer iSeries division.

Board Service 
Stevenson is currently serving on the board of Mitek Systems and Skyworks Solutions,  as well as on the advisory board of TruU, a privately held software company.

She also has served on the board of directors of Cloudera, Riverbed Technology, Boston Private Financial Holdings, Inc., and the National Center for Women & IT.

Stevenson is often quoted in the press on the new reality of technology driving business. "Every business is a technology business," according to Stevenson, "and more companies are adding CIOs to their boardrooms."

"The three things Boards and CEOs expect from their CIO, which are (1) to reimagine and define the customer experience, (2) extreme productivity, and (3) that they invent and deliver new products and services to allow them to grow."

Recognition 
Stevenson has won numerous awards including the HMG Strategy 2021 Global Leadership Institute's “Leading into the C-Suite” award, Technology Magazine's #19 of the Top 100 Women in Technology 2021 and Constellation's 2020 Business Transformation BT150 award. As well as recognition for her CIO leadership contributions including Silicon Valley Business Journal's Best CIO, Evanta Top 10 Breakaway Leader, Huffington Post's Most Social CIO and the CIO 100 award by CIO.com. She was named the Woman of Excellence Digital Trailblazer by the National Association of Female Executives (NAFE), and the Forbes CIO Innovation Award.

References

American computer businesspeople
Businesspeople in software
Intel people
Living people
Chief information officers
Year of birth missing (living people)